A list of notable films produced in Greece in the 2010s (decade).

2010s

References

External links
 Greek film at the IMDb
 Feature films GREECE at Cineuropa.org

2010s
Lists of 2010s films
Films